The Liga I was the second level of professional basketball in Romania. There were 25 teams, divided in 4 groups in Liga I. The competition was dissolved at the start of the 2018–19 season, when the Romanian Basketball System was reformed and Liga Națională remained the only senior level competition. However, league was reestablished in 2019.

Current teams (2020-2021) 

 Știința București
 Rapid București
 Agronomia București
 Aurel Vlaicu București
 Liliecii București
 Lumina Wolves
 CSM Ploiești
 CSU Ploiești
 CSU Mures
 Universitatea Cluj
 Sibiu 2

References

External links 
24secunde.ro (Romanian)
TotalBaschet.ro (Romanian)
Official site of the Romanian basketball federation
Baschetromania.ro (Romanian)
Romanian league on Eurobasket

Basketball competitions in Romania
Basketball leagues in Europe